Stanley Myron Handelman (November 21, 1929 – August 5, 2007) was an American stand-up comedian who, during a ten-year period between 1965 and 1975, appeared on numerous television variety shows.

Early years
The Brooklyn-born Handelman was a late 1960s fixture on programs such as The Merv Griffin Show, Dean Martin Presents the Golddiggers, The Barbara McNair Show, The Flip Wilson Show, The Ed Sullivan Show and The Tonight Show Starring Johnny Carson, and films such as Harvey Middleman, Fireman (1965) and Linda Lovelace for President (1975).

His stooped, resigned appearance and surreal sense of humor ("I just got up from a sick bed. I don't know what's wrong with it—it just lies there") made him a highly-recognizable celebrity on the talk show circuit and resulted in about ten appearances on Johnny Carson. After the demise of the TV variety shows, he accepted a handful of acting roles and subsequently taught the art of stand-up comedy in Los Angeles.

According to the Third Amendment and Complete Restatement of the Rodney Dangerfield Trust, there were two bequests regarding Handelman. The first was to distribute to Handelman upon Dangerfield's death the sum of $10,000 in cash (page six, 4.3 (f).) The second was to distribute during Handelman's lifetime the sum of $800 per month (page nine, 6.3 (a).)

Marriages
Handelman married four times, and had four sons and one daughter.  They are Paul, Michael, Robert and Daniel, and his daughter, Stefanie Wilder-Taylor.

Death
He died on August 5, 2007, in his Panorama City, California home in the San Fernando Valley from a heart attack. He was 77.

References

External links

1929 births
2007 deaths
American stand-up comedians
American male television actors
Television personalities from Los Angeles
20th-century American Jews
People from Brooklyn
People from Panorama City, Los Angeles
Comedians from New York (state)
20th-century American comedians
21st-century American comedians
Comedians from California
20th-century American male actors
21st-century American Jews